Brachyloma preissii (common name globe heath) is a plant in the heath family, Ericaceae, endemic to Western Australia.
It was first described by Otto Wilhelm Sonder in 1845. The specific epithet, preissii, honours the botanist Ludwig Preiss.

References

External links
Brachyloma preissii: Occurrence data from the Australasian Virtual Herbarium

Plants described in 1845
Flora of Western Australia
Taxa named by Otto Wilhelm Sonder